The second USS Sapphire (PYc-2) was a patrol boat in the United States Navy.

Construction
Originally a private yacht and later a navy training vessel, Sapphire was built in 1929, and named Margo by George Lawley & Son, Neponset, Massachusetts. It was acquired by the US Navy from a later owner, Mr. Leon Mandel, Quonset, Rhode Island, on 1 November 1940. The navy renamed the boat Sapphire, designated it PYc—2, and converted it for Navy use. It was officially commissioned at Boston, on 6 June 1941.

Service history

World War II, 1941–1945
In August 1941, Sapphire was sent to Norfolk, Virginia, to outfit her for sea duty.  In September 1941, Sapphire left Norfolk with orders to patrol and perform anti-mine operations in the area of the Panama Canal. While on her southbound voyage she was abruptly ordered to reverse course and proceeded north to her home port, New London, Connecticut. There, throughout World War II, the ship supported various Submarine School programs, but was primarily engaged in training prospective commanding officers in attack procedures and in testing sound equipment. Sapphire also engaged in anti-submarine patrols and some fought actions with German U-boats.  As Storekeeper First Class Ed Hickey, a crewmen on Sapphire, commented, "We knew we were a sitting duck for any U-boat that we found since a converted yacht is no match even though we had some depth charges and a few other armaments."

One crewman was killed and the remainder of the crew abandoned ship in Plow City′s lifeboats. Sapphire was ordered to search for and rescue the surviving crew, and on 26 May 1942 she located 30 survivors in lifeboats.

R-6 suffered no damage or casualties.

Decommissioning and disposal
With the end of World War II  in August 1945, Sapphire was designated for inactivation. On 19 September 1945, she departed New London and proceeded to Charleston, South Carolina, where she was decommissioned on 29 October 1945. Struck from the Navy List on 13 November 1945, she was transferred to the United States Maritime Commission for disposal through sale on 3 September 1946.

References

Citations

Bibliography
 Hinman, Charles R., and Douglas E. Campbell. The Submarine Has No Friends: Friendly Fire Incidents Involving U.S. Submarines During World War II. Syneca Research Group, Inc., 2019. .

External links

Annual List of Merchant Vessels of the United States
https://uboat.net/allies/merchants/ships/1694.html

1929 ships
Patrol vessels of the United States Navy
Patrol vessels of the United States
World War II patrol vessels of the United States